Mehdiabad (also Romanized as Mehdīābād; also known as Mehdīābād-e Sheykh ‘Alī Kelāyeh) is a village in Rudboneh Rural District, Rudboneh District, Lahijan County, Gilan Province, Iran. At the 2006 census, its population was 662, in 186 families.

References 

Populated places in Lahijan County